Martin McGarvey (born 16 January 1972) was a Scottish footballer. He began his career with junior side Irvine Meadow before signing 'senior' with Dumbarton. Here he would spend seven seasons before moving back to play in the 'junior' ranks with Arthurlie, where he would be part of a Scottish Junior Cup winning side.

References

1972 births
Scottish footballers
Dumbarton F.C. players
Scottish Football League players
Living people
Association football midfielders